Meetings with Remarkable Manuscripts: Twelve Journeys into the Medieval World is a 2017 book by historian Christopher de Hamel that explores the European medieval world through an in-depth study of 12 illuminated manuscripts. It won the Wolfson History Prize in 2017.

References

Art history books
Books about books
2017 non-fiction books
English-language books
Books about religion
Allen Lane (imprint) books